Martin Phipps (born 1 August 1968) is a British composer, who has worked on numerous film and television projects.

Life and career
He is the son of Sue Pears and Jack Phipps, an arts administrator who had previously founded a management agency, which acted for many leading musical figures (including Benjamin Britten, Phipps's godfather).

Having read drama at Manchester University, Phipps enjoyed early critical success with Eureka Street, and went on to score the BBC period dramas North & South and The Virgin Queen, for which he was recognised with the Ivor Novello Award for Best Original Score.

Phipps scored Low Winter Sun for Channel 4, starring Mark Strong and Brian McCardie and Persuasion, the most recent ITV adaptation of Jane Austen's novel, as well as Grow Your Own, a feature for Warp Films. He also scored the BBC adaptation of Jane Austen's Sense and Sensibility, adapted by Andrew Davies. Phipps was then commissioned to score the BBC's Oliver Twist adaptation, for which he was recognised with the Ivor Novello Award 2008 for Best Television Soundtrack.

Phipps went on to score the Rowan Joffé-helmed drama, Hurndall for Talkback Thames followed by Wallander  for Yellow Bird/Left Bank Pictures, starring Kenneth Branagh, for which he was recognised with the BAFTA Craft Award 2009 for Best Original TV Score. He then went on to write the music for the feature film Endgame, starring William Hurt, Derek Jacobi, Mark Strong, Jonny Lee Miller and Chiwetel Ejiofor, chronicling the breakdown of S. African apartheid, directed by Pete Travis. It was entered into competition at the Sundance Film Festival. He also scored Small Island for Ruby Films/BBC, winning the BAFTA Craft Award 2010 for Best Original Television Music. More recently, he completed the score for his first feature film, Brighton Rock and composed the music for the newest BBC adaptation of Great Expectations.

In 2005, Phipps wrote the score to the film Pierrepoint. Other credits include The Wife of Bath from the BBC's contemporary adaptation of the Canterbury Tales, and the contemporary drama Dirty Filthy Love. He also scored the British feature film, The Flying Scotsman, and The Line of Beauty.

Phipps scored the UK thriller feature Harry Brown for Cutting Edge/Marv Films, starring Michael Caine, as well as Rowan Joffé's feature adaptation of Graham Greene's Brighton Rock. Mike Diver described Phipps' score as "rich and sumptuous of tone and depth". He co-wrote the score with Emily Barker for the BBC drama The Shadow Line. Authored by Hugo Blick for the BBC, it was described by one critic as "a maddening, stylish experiment in doing something completely, admirably different with television". More recent credits include the first series of Peaky Blinders on BBC Two for which he was nominated for a BAFTA Craft Award and The Honourable Woman. His documentary work includes scoring the documentary Britain in a Day. More recently he composed the score of the film Woman in Gold in collaboration with Hans Zimmer.

Phipps composed the soundtrack for the 2016 miniseries War & Peace. Phipps said he "ended up coming onto the project early on", and that he was given room to "run with it... from the very beginning." The soundtrack was released on 13 May 2016. He also composed the theme to the same year's Victoria, as well as incidental music of the early episodes. The theme was sung by the Mediæval Bæbes.

Phipps also composed the soundtrack for season 3, season 4 and season 5 of The Crown.

Filmography

Films

Television

References

External links
 Martin Phipps at COOL Music Ltd

1968 births
Alumni of the Victoria University of Manchester
British film score composers
British male film score composers
British television composers
Ivor Novello Award winners
Living people
Male television composers